Hans Van Bylen (born 26 April 1961 in Berchem, Belgium) is a Belgian manager who has been serving as the CEO of Henkel from May 2016 to December 2019. He is married with three children.

Education
Hans Van Bylen studied business economics at the University of Antwerp and graduated with both a degree in business management and a Master of Business Administration. He also completed numerous executive development courses, e.g. at Harvard Business School and INSEAD. He is fluent in Dutch, English, German and French.

Career
Van Bylen joined Henkel in 1984 as Product Manager for detergents in Belgium. After several positions in marketing for detergents and cosmetics, he took over management responsibilities for various countries and regions. In 2005, he became member of Henkel's management board and served as Executive Vice President for the Beauty Care business.

In May 2016 Van Bylen was appointed Chief Executive Officer of Henkel, succeeding Kasper Rorsted who joined adidas. Under his leadership, Henkel acquired the US based The Sun Products Corporation for 3.2 billion euros in June 2016. In November 2016, he presented the company's new strategy (Henkel 2020+) During his period as CEO, the company realised 25 acquisitions worth 7 billion euros. Henkel saw its turnover grow up to 20.1 billion euros in 2019. In 2019 it was announced that Van Bylen would step down as CEO of Henkel for personal reasons. He was succeeded in 2020 by his right-hand and former Henkel CFO, Carsten Knobel.

Van Bylen served on several boards in the US and in Germany, such as Ecolab and GfK. Moreover, he was active as an independent board member in non-profit organizations like the Federation of German Industries (BDI) and the prestigious European Round Table of Industries (ERT). He was also President of the German Chemical Industry Association (VCI) until March 2020.

Given his many years of business experience at the top of German industry and extensive network in the German business world, Van Bylen is still considered a very influential voice in Belgium today. Since his departure at Henkel, he is active as a board member of several Belgian and international companies. He currently is the chairman of the Belgian diaper manufacturer Ontex and was appointed by the Belgian federal government as a board member of Brussels Airlines, a subsidiary of German carrier Lufthansa.

Other activities

Corporate boards
 GfK, Member of the Supervisory Board (2013-2017) 
 Ecolab, Member of the Board of Directors (2007-2008) 
 Lanxess, Member of the Supervisory Board (2020-ongoing)
 Brussels Airlines, Member of the Supervisory Board (2020-ongoing)  
 Ontex, Chairman of the Board of Directors (2020-ongoing)
 Etex, Member of the Board of Directors (2020-ongoing)

Non-profit organizations
 German Chemical Industry Association (VCI), President (until March 2020) 
 Federation of German Industries (BDI), Member of the Presidium (2018-2019)
 Baden-Badener Unternehmer-Gespräche (BBUG), Member of the Board of Trustees
 Consumer Goods Forum, Member of the Board of Directors
 European Round Table of Industrialists (ERT), Member
Vlerick Business School, Member of the advisory board
Facio Therapies, Member of the Board of Directors
 Friends of the Deutsche Oper am Rhein, Member of the Board

Recognitions
Van Bylen was awarded "CEO with the best image 2016 " among Germany's DAX CEOs by media analytics institute Unicepta

References 

1961 births
Living people
Belgian chief executives
German chief executives
Harvard Business School alumni
People from Berchem
People in the chemical industry
University of Antwerp alumni
Henkel